Hello Beautiful is an alternative/hip hop/rock fusion band from Whitby, Ontario, Canada.

Hello Beautiful can also refer to:

"Hello, Beautiful", a 1931 song by Maurice Chevalier, also featured in several Betty Boop films (Bimbo Express, 1931; Stopping the Show, 1932; Betty Boop's Rise to Fame, 1934)
"Hello Beautiful", a song from the 2007 Jonas Brothers album
"Hello, Beautiful", a song by Vic Mignogna from his 2007 album Metafiction
The Powers Girl, sometimes retitled Hello, Beautiful, a 1943 musical comedy about women employed by a modeling agency

Hello Beautiful!, a popular weekly radio program in Chicago about arts, architecture and culture, created and hosted by Edward Lifson
hellobeautiful.com, a website dedicated to news and social commentary for women of color